Sir John Geers Cotterell, 1st Baronet (21 September 1757 – 26 January 1845) was a British politician. He served as the Conservative Member of Parliament for Herefordshire from 1802 to 1803, and from 1806 to 1831.

Early life
Cotterell was born on 21 September 1757. He was the son of Anne Geers and Sir John Brookes-Cotterell, High Sheriff of Herefordshire in 1761.

His paternal grandparents were John Cotterell and Mary ( Jackson) Cotterell. His mother was the daughter, and heiress, of John Geers of Garnons, Herefordshire.

Career
Cotterell was known as an anti-Catholic Tory squire, or large landowner, in Hereford.

He served as the Conservative Member of Parliament for Herefordshire from 1802 to 1803, and from 1806 to 1831.

He was created Cotterell Baronet, of Garnons in the County of Hereford, on 2 November 1805 in the Baronetage of the United Kingdom.

Personal life
On 4 January 1791, Cotterell married Frances Isabella Evans, daughter of Henry Michael Evans of Spring Grove, Uxbridge. Before her death on 3 July 1813, they were the parents of four sons and six daughters, including:

 Mary Cotterell (d. 1868), who married Thomas Taylor in 1820.
 Sarah Frances Cotterell (d. 1868), who married Newton Byron Hanson of Gilstead Hall, Pilgrims Hatch, in 1848.
 Caroline Cotterell (d. 1878), who married William Leigh of Roby Hall, Lancashire, 1828.
 John Henry Cotterell (1800–1834), who married Hon. Pyne Jesse Brand Trevor, daughter of Gen. Henry Trevor, 21st Baron Dacre, in 1828.
 Harriet Cotterell (1810–1891), who married Rev. Edwin Hotham, son of Sir William Hotham, in 1838.

Sir John died Garnons on 26 January 1845 was buried in the family vault at Mansel church. As he was predeceased by his eldest son, his grandson John succeeded to the baronetcy.

Descendants
Through his only son John, he was a grandfather of Sir John Cotterell, 2nd Baronet (1830–1847), who died unmarried while at Eton, and Sir Geers Cotterell, 3rd Baronet (1834–1900), who married Hon. Katherine Margaret Airey, daughter of Gen. Richard Airey, 1st Baron Airey with whom he had issue.

References

1757 births
1845 deaths
People from Hereford
Baronets in the Baronetage of the United Kingdom
Tory MPs (pre-1834)
Members of the Parliament of the United Kingdom for English constituencies
UK MPs 1802–1806
UK MPs 1806–1807
UK MPs 1807–1812
UK MPs 1812–1818
UK MPs 1818–1820
UK MPs 1820–1826
UK MPs 1826–1830
UK MPs 1830–1831